Ethology is the scientific study of non-human animal behavior, usually with a focus on behaviour under natural conditions, and viewing behaviour as an evolutionarily adaptive trait. Behaviourism as a term also describes the scientific and objective study of animal behavior, usually referring to measured responses to stimuli or to trained behavioral responses in a laboratory context, without a particular emphasis on evolutionary adaptivity. Throughout history, different naturalists have studied aspects of animal behaviour. Ethology has its scientific roots in the work of Charles Darwin and of American and German ornithologists of the late 19th and early 20th century, including Charles O. Whitman, Oskar Heinroth, and Wallace Craig. The modern discipline of ethology is generally considered to have begun during the 1930s with the work of Dutch biologist Nikolaas Tinbergen and Austrian biologists Konrad Lorenz and Karl von Frisch, the three recipients of the 1973 Nobel Prize in Physiology or Medicine. Ethology combines laboratory and field science, with a strong relation to some other disciplines such as neuroanatomy, ecology, and evolutionary biology. Ethologists typically show interest in a behavioral process rather than in a particular animal group, and often study one type of behavior, such as aggression, in a number of unrelated species.

Ethology is a rapidly growing field. Since the dawn of the 21st century researchers have re-examined and reached new conclusions in many aspects of animal communication, emotions, culture, learning and sexuality that the scientific community long thought it understood. New fields, such as neuroethology, have developed.

Understanding ethology or animal behavior can be important in animal training. Considering the natural behaviors of different species or breeds enables trainers to select the individuals best suited to perform the required task. It also enables trainers to encourage the performance of naturally occurring behaviors and the discontinuance of undesirable behaviors.

Etymology
The term was first popularized by American myrmecologist (a person who studies ants) William Morton Wheeler in 1902.

History

The beginnings of ethology 

Because ethology is considered a topic of biology, ethologists have been concerned particularly with the evolution of behaviour and its understanding in terms of natural selection. In one sense, the first modern ethologist was Charles Darwin, whose 1872 book The Expression of the Emotions in Man and Animals influenced many ethologists. He pursued his interest in behaviour by encouraging his protégé George Romanes, who investigated animal learning and intelligence using an anthropomorphic method, anecdotal cognitivism, that did not gain scientific support.

Other early ethologists, such as Eugène Marais, Charles O. Whitman, Oskar Heinroth, Wallace Craig and Julian Huxley, instead concentrated on behaviours that can be called instinctive, or natural, in that they occur in all members of a species under specified circumstances. Their beginning for studying the behaviour of a new species was to construct an ethogram (a description of the main types of behaviour with their frequencies of occurrence). This provided an objective, cumulative database of behaviour, which subsequent researchers could check and supplement.

Growth of the field 
Due to the work of Konrad Lorenz and Niko Tinbergen, ethology developed strongly in continental Europe during the years prior to World War II. After the war, Tinbergen moved to the University of Oxford, and ethology became stronger in the UK, with the additional influence of William Thorpe, Robert Hinde, and Patrick Bateson at the Sub-department of Animal Behaviour of the University of Cambridge. In this period, too, ethology began to develop strongly in North America.

Lorenz, Tinbergen, and von Frisch were jointly awarded the Nobel Prize in Physiology or Medicine in 1973 for their work of developing ethology.

Ethology is now a well-recognized scientific discipline, and has a number of journals covering developments in the subject, such as Animal Behaviour, Animal Welfare, Applied Animal Behaviour Science, Animal Cognition, Behaviour, Behavioral Ecology and Ethology: International Journal of Behavioural Biology. In 1972, the International Society for Human Ethology was founded to promote exchange of knowledge and opinions concerning human behaviour gained by applying ethological principles and methods and published their journal, The Human Ethology Bulletin. In 2008, in a paper published in the journal Behaviour, ethologist Peter Verbeek introduced the term "Peace Ethology" as a sub-discipline of Human Ethology that is concerned with issues of human conflict, conflict resolution, reconciliation, war, peacemaking, and peacekeeping behaviour.

Social ethology and recent developments 
In 1972, the English ethologist John H. Crook distinguished comparative ethology from social ethology, and argued that much of the ethology that had existed so far was really comparative ethology—examining animals as individuals—whereas, in the future, ethologists would need to concentrate on the behaviour of social groups of animals and the social structure within them.

E. O. Wilson's book Sociobiology: The New Synthesis appeared in 1975, and since that time, the study of behaviour has been much more concerned with social aspects. It has also been driven by the stronger, but more sophisticated, Darwinism associated with Wilson, Robert Trivers, and W. D. Hamilton. The related development of behavioural ecology has also helped transform ethology. Furthermore, a substantial rapprochement with comparative psychology has occurred, so the modern scientific study of behaviour offers a more or less seamless spectrum of approaches: from animal cognition to more traditional comparative psychology, ethology, sociobiology, and behavioural ecology. In 2020, Dr. Tobias Starzak and Professor Albert Newen from the Institute of Philosophy II at the Ruhr University Bochum postulated that animals may have beliefs.

Relationship with comparative psychology 

Comparative psychology also studies animal behavior, but, as opposed to ethology, is construed as a sub-topic of psychology rather than as one of biology. Historically, where comparative psychology has included research on animal behavior in the context of what is known about human psychology, ethology involves research on animal behavior in the context of what is known about animal anatomy, physiology, neurobiology, and phylogenetic history. Furthermore, early comparative psychologists concentrated on the study of learning and tended to research behavior in artificial situations, whereas early ethologists concentrated on behavior in natural situations, tending to describe it as instinctive.

The two approaches are complementary rather than competitive, but they do result in different perspectives, and occasionally conflicts of opinion about matters of substance. In addition, for most of the twentieth century, comparative psychology developed most strongly in North America, while ethology was stronger in Europe. From a practical standpoint, early comparative psychologists concentrated on gaining extensive knowledge of the behavior of very few species. Ethologists were more interested in understanding behavior across a wide range of species to facilitate principled comparisons across taxonomic groups. Ethologists have made much more use of such cross-species comparisons than comparative psychologists have.

Instinct 

The Merriam-Webster dictionary defines instinct as "A largely inheritable and unalterable tendency of an organism to make a complex and specific response to environmental stimuli without involving reason".

Fixed action patterns 

An important development, associated with the name of Konrad Lorenz though probably due more to his teacher, Oskar Heinroth, was the identification of fixed action patterns. Lorenz popularized these as instinctive responses that would occur reliably in the presence of identifiable stimuli called sign stimuli or "releasing stimuli". Fixed action patterns are now considered to be instinctive behavioural sequences that are relatively invariant within the species and that almost inevitably run to completion.

One example of a releaser is the beak movements of many bird species performed by newly hatched chicks, which stimulates the mother to regurgitate food for her offspring. Other examples are the classic studies by Tinbergen on the egg-retrieval behaviour and the effects of a "supernormal stimulus" on the behaviour of graylag geese.

One investigation of this kind was the study of the waggle dance ("dance language") in bee communication by Karl von Frisch.

Learning

Habituation

Habituation is a simple form of learning and occurs in many animal taxa. It is the process whereby an animal ceases responding to a stimulus. Often, the response is an innate behavior. Essentially, the animal learns not to respond to irrelevant stimuli. For example, prairie dogs (Cynomys ludovicianus) give alarm calls when predators approach, causing all individuals in the group to quickly scramble down burrows. When prairie dog towns are located near trails used by humans, giving alarm calls every time a person walks by is expensive in terms of time and energy. Habituation to humans is therefore an important adaptation in this context.

Associative learning

Associative learning in animal behavior is any learning process in which a new response becomes associated with a particular stimulus. The first studies of associative learning were made by Russian physiologist Ivan Pavlov, who observed that dogs trained to associate food with the ringing of a bell would salivate on hearing the bell.

Imprinting

Imprinting enables the young to discriminate the members of their own species, vital for reproductive success. This important type of learning only takes place in a very limited period of time. Konrad Lorenz observed that the young of birds such as geese and chickens followed their mothers spontaneously from almost the first day after they were hatched, and he discovered that this response could be imitated by an arbitrary stimulus if the eggs were incubated artificially and the stimulus were presented during a critical period that continued for a few days after hatching.

Cultural learning

Observational learning

Imitation

Imitation is an advanced behavior whereby an animal observes and exactly replicates the behavior of another.
The National Institutes of Health reported that capuchin monkeys preferred the company of researchers who imitated them to that of researchers who did not. The monkeys not only spent more time with their imitators but also preferred to engage in a simple task with them even when provided with the option of performing the same task with a non-imitator. Imitation has been observed in recent research on chimpanzees; not only did these chimps copy the actions of another individual, when given a choice, the chimps preferred to imitate the actions of the higher-ranking elder chimpanzee as opposed to the lower-ranking young chimpanzee.

Stimulus and local enhancement

There are various ways animals can learn using observational learning but without the process of imitation. One of these is stimulus enhancement in which individuals become interested in an object as the result of observing others interacting with the object. Increased interest in an object can result in object manipulation which allows for new object-related behaviours by trial-and-error learning. Haggerty (1909) devised an experiment in which a monkey climbed up the side of a cage, placed its arm into a wooden chute, and pulled a rope in the chute to release food. Another monkey was provided an opportunity to obtain the food after watching a monkey go through this process on four occasions. The monkey performed a different method and finally succeeded after trial-and-error. Another example familiar to some cat and dog owners is the ability of their animals to open doors. The action of humans operating the handle to open the door results in the animals becoming interested in the handle and then by trial-and-error, they learn to operate the handle and open the door.

In local enhancement, a demonstrator attracts an observer's attention to a particular location. Local enhancement has been observed to transmit foraging information among birds, rats and pigs. The stingless bee (Trigona corvina) uses local enhancement to locate other members of their colony and food resources.

Social transmission

A well-documented example of social transmission of a behaviour occurred in a group of macaques on Hachijojima Island, Japan. The macaques lived in the inland forest until the 1960s, when a group of researchers started giving them potatoes on the beach: soon, they started venturing onto the beach, picking the potatoes from the sand, and cleaning and eating them. About one year later, an individual was observed bringing a potato to the sea, putting it into the water with one hand, and cleaning it with the other. This behaviour was soon expressed by the individuals living in contact with her; when they gave birth, this behaviour was also expressed by their young - a form of social transmission.

Teaching

Teaching is a highly specialized aspect of learning in which the "teacher" (demonstrator) adjusts their behaviour to increase the probability of the "pupil" (observer) achieving the desired end-result of the behaviour. For example, orcas are known to intentionally beach themselves to catch pinniped prey. Mother orcas teach their young to catch pinnipeds by pushing them onto the shore and encouraging them to attack the prey. Because the mother orca is altering her behaviour to help her offspring learn to catch prey, this is evidence of teaching. Teaching is not limited to mammals. Many insects, for example, have been observed demonstrating various forms of teaching to obtain food. Ants, for example, will guide each other to food sources through a process called "tandem running," in which an ant will guide a companion ant to a source of food. It has been suggested that the pupil ant is able to learn this route to obtain food in the future or teach the route to other ants. This behaviour of teaching is also exemplified by crows, specifically New Caledonian crows. The adults (whether individual or in families) teach their young adolescent offspring how to construct and utilize tools. For example, Pandanus branches are used to extract insects and other larvae from holes within trees.

Mating and the fight for supremacy

Individual reproduction is the most important phase in the proliferation of individuals or genes within a species: for this reason, there exist complex mating rituals, which can be very complex even if they are often regarded as fixed action patterns. The stickleback's complex mating ritual, studied by Tinbergen, is regarded as a notable example.

Often in social life, animals fight for the right to reproduce, as well as social supremacy. A common example of fighting for social and sexual supremacy is the so-called pecking order among poultry. Every time a group of poultry cohabitate for a certain time length, they establish a pecking order. In these groups, one chicken dominates the others and can peck without being pecked. A second chicken can peck all the others except the first, and so on. Chickens higher in the pecking order may at times be distinguished by their healthier appearance when compared to lower level chickens. While the pecking order is establishing, frequent and violent fights can happen, but once established, it is broken only when other individuals enter the group, in which case the pecking order re-establishes from scratch.

Living in groups

Several animal species, including humans, tend to live in groups. Group size is a major aspect of their social environment. Social life is probably a complex and effective survival strategy. It may be regarded as a sort of symbiosis among individuals of the same species: a society is composed of a group of individuals belonging to the same species living within well-defined rules on food management, role assignments and reciprocal dependence.

When biologists interested in evolution theory first started examining social behaviour, some apparently unanswerable questions arose, such as how the birth of sterile castes, like in bees, could be explained through an evolving mechanism that emphasizes the reproductive success of as many individuals as possible, or why, amongst animals living in small groups like squirrels, an individual would risk its own life to save the rest of the group. These behaviours may be examples of altruism. Of course, not all behaviours are altruistic, as indicated by the table below. For example, revengeful behaviour was at one point claimed to have been observed exclusively in Homo sapiens. However, other species have been reported to be vengeful including chimpanzees, as well as anecdotal reports of vengeful camels.

Altruistic behaviour has been explained by the gene-centred view of evolution.

Benefits and costs of group living
One advantage of group living can be decreased predation. If the number of predator attacks stays the same despite increasing prey group size, each prey may have a reduced risk of predator attacks through the dilution effect. Further, according to the selfish herd theory, the fitness benefits associated with group living vary depending on the location of an individual within the group. The theory suggests that conspecifics positioned at the centre of a group will reduce the likelihood predations while those at the periphery will become more vulnerable to attack. Additionally, a predator that is confused by a mass of individuals can find it more difficult to single out one target. For this reason, the zebra's stripes offer not only camouflage in a habitat of tall grasses, but also the advantage of blending into a herd of other zebras. In groups, prey can also actively reduce their predation risk through more effective defence tactics, or through earlier detection of predators through increased vigilance.

Another advantage of group living can be an increased ability to forage for food. Group members may exchange information about food sources between one another, facilitating the process of resource location. Honeybees are a notable example of this, using the waggle dance to communicate the location of flowers to the rest of their hive. Predators also receive benefits from hunting in groups, through using better strategies and being able to take down larger prey.

Some disadvantages accompany living in groups. Living in close proximity to other animals can facilitate the transmission of parasites and disease, and groups that are too large may also experience greater competition for resources and mates.

Group size

Theoretically, social animals should have optimal group sizes that maximize the benefits and minimize the costs of group living. However, in nature, most groups are stable at slightly larger than optimal sizes. Because it generally benefits an individual to join an optimally-sized group, despite slightly decreasing the advantage for all members, groups may continue to increase in size until it is more advantageous to remain alone than to join an overly full group.

Tinbergen's four questions for ethologists

Niko Tinbergen argued that ethology always needed to include four kinds of explanation in any instance of behaviour:

 Function – How does the behaviour affect the animal's chances of survival and reproduction? Why does the animal respond that way instead of some other way?
 Causation – What are the stimuli that elicit the response, and how has it been modified by recent learning?
 Development – How does the behaviour change with age, and what early experiences are necessary for the animal to display the behaviour?
 Evolutionary history – How does the behaviour compare with similar behaviour in related species, and how might it have begun through the process of phylogeny?

These explanations are complementary rather than mutually exclusive—all instances of behaviour require an explanation at each of these four levels. For example, the function of eating is to acquire nutrients (which ultimately aids survival and reproduction), but the immediate cause of eating is hunger (causation). Hunger and eating are evolutionarily ancient and are found in many species (evolutionary history), and develop early within an organism's lifespan (development). It is easy to confuse such questions—for example, to argue that people eat because they're hungry and not to acquire nutrients—without realizing that the reason people experience hunger is because it causes them to acquire nutrients.

See also

 Animal behavior consultant
 Anthrozoology
 Behavioral ecology
 Cognitive ethology
 Deception in animals
 Human ethology
 List of abnormal behaviours in animals

References

Further reading
Burkhardt, Richard W. Jr. "On the Emergence of Ethology as a Scientific Discipline." Conspectus of History 1.7 (1981).

External links

 
Ethology

Articles containing video clips